Amina (or Aminah, Amna) meaning "safe one, protected" and Ameena (Ameenah, Amineh; Arabic: أمينة amīnah) meaning "devoted, honest, straightforward, trusty, worth of belief (believable), loyal, faithful, obedient of Iman" are Arabic female given names. The male form of the latter is Amin. Aminah was the mother of the Islamic prophet Muhammad.

People with the name
People with the name include:

Amina 
Aminah (549–577), mother of prophet Muhammad
 Amina bint Affan, was the sister of third Muslim caliph Uthman (r. 644–656).
Amina (died 1610), Hausa warrior queen of Zazzau (now Zaria), in what is now northwest Nigeria
Princess Lalla Amina of Morocco (1954–2012), Moroccan princess
Amina of the Maldives, or Amina Rani Kilegefa’anu ( 1759), monarch, as Sultana regnant, of the Maldives from 1757 until 1759 after acting as regent from 1753 until 1757
Amina Bint al-Majlisi, female Safavid mujtahideh
Amina Adil (1930–2004), Tatar writer and Islamic theologian
Amina Afzali (born 1957), Afghani politician and government minister
Amina Alaoui (born 1964), Moroccan interpreter of Andalusian classical music
Amina Annabi (born 1962), French-Tunisian singer
Amina Bakhit (born 1990), Sudanese middle-distance runner
Amina Bazindre, Nigerien diplomat
Amina Benkhadra (born 1954), Moroccan politician
Amina Bettiche (born 1987), Algerian steeplechase runner
Amina Begum, mother of Shuja-ud-Daula the last ruler of Bengal
Amina Cachalia (1930–2013), South African anti-Apartheid activist, women's rights activist and politician
Amina Chifupa (1976–2007), Tanzanian politician and MP
Amina Clement (born 1963), Tanzanian politician and MP
Amina Desai (?–2009), South Africa's longest serving female Indian political prisoner
Amina Dilbazi (1919–2010), Azerbaijani folk dancer
Amina Doherty, Nigerian women's rights advocate
Amina Figarova (born 1964), Azerbaijani jazz composer and pianist
Amina Filali, Moroccan 16-year-old girl who committed suicide in 2012 after she was forced to marry her rapist
Amina Gerba (born 1961), Cameroonian–Canadian businesswoman and entrepreneur
Amina Aït Hammou (born 1978), Moroccan runner
Amina Hydari (1878–1939), Indian social worker
Amina Inloes, American scholar, researcher, educator, public speaker, translator
Amina Al Jassim, Saudi Arabian fashion designer of haute couture and jellabiyas
Amina Lawal (born 1973), Nigerian woman convicted by Islamic Sharia court in 2002
Amina Lemrini, Moroccan human rights activist
Amina Mama (born 1958), Nigerian-British writer, feminist and academic
Amina Mohamed (born 1961), Somali lawyer, diplomat and politician
Amina J. Mohammed (born 1961), United Nations Special Adviser
Amina Claudine Myers (born 1942), American jazz pianist, organist, vocalist, composer, and musical arranger
Amina Rakhim (born 1989), Kazakhstani tennis player
Amina Rizk (1910–2003), Egyptian actress
Amina Rouba (born 1986), Algerian rower
Amina Al Said (1914–1995), an Egyptian journalist and feminist
Amina Said (born 1953), Tunisian francophone author
Amina Said Ali, Somali author, poet, and medical scientist
Amina Shah (1918–2014), anthologiser of Sufi stories and folk tales
Amina Hanum Syrtlanoff (1884–?), public figure, sister of mercy, theosophist, mason
Amina Tyler (born 1994), Tunisian activist associated with Femen
Amina Wadud (born 1952), American feminist
Amina Wali, Pakistani alpine skier
Amina Zaripova (born 1976), Russian rhythmic gymnast
Amina Zaydan (born 1966), Egyptian novelist and short story writer
Amina Zoubir (born 1983), Algerian artist

Aaminah 
Aaminah Haq, Pakistani model and actress

Aminah 
Aminah, or Aminah bint Wahb, the mother of the Islamic prophet, Muhammad
Aminah Assilmi (1945–2010), American broadcast journalist
Aminah Cendrakasih (born 1938), Indonesian actress
Aminah McCloud, American Professor of Religious Studies and Islamic World Studies
Aminah Robinson (1940–2015), American artist
Amīnah al-Saʿīd (1914–1995), Egyptian journalist and women's rights activist

Amena 
Amena Begum, Pakistani politician, former MP of East Pakistan
Amena Khan (born 1983), British-Indian model and fashion designer

Ameena 
Ameena Ahmad Ahuja, Indian painter, calligrapher, writer and linguist
Ameena Begum (1892–1949), birth name Ora Ray Baker, wife of Sufi Master Inayat Khan
Ameena Begum (politician), Bangladeshi politician and Member of Parliament
Ameena Hussein (born 1964), Sri Lankan sociologist, novelist, editor
Ameena Saiyid, Pakistani publisher
Ameena, Indian trafficking victim of the Ameena case

Ameenah 
Ameenah Ayub Allen, British film actress
Ameenah Gurib (born 1959), 6th President of the Republic of Mauritius
Ameenah Kaplan (born 1974), American actress, musician and choreographer

Amineh 
Amineh Kakabaveh (born 1970), Swedish politician of Iranian Kurdish descent
Amineh Kazemzadeh (born 1963), Iranian painter

Fictional characters
 Amina, a sleepwalking character in the opera La sonnambula
Ameena Badawi, in TV series EastEnders
Amina Hydrose, in the 1991 Indian film Amina Tailors
Amina Abdallah Arraf al Omari, fictional character or hoax persona created and maintained by American Tom MacMaster

See also

Amna
Iman (Islam)

Arabic feminine given names